Goring and Streatley Bridge is a road bridge across the River Thames in England. The bridge links the twin villages of Goring-on-Thames, Oxfordshire, and Streatley, Berkshire, and is adjacent to Goring Lock.

The present bridge was built in 1923, and is in two parts: The western bridge is from Streatley to an island in the river (overlooking The Swan hotel, once owned by Danny La Rue); The eastern bridge is from the island to Goring and overlooks Goring Lock. The bridge consists of timber struts supporting a metal roadway.

Both the Thames Path and The Ridgeway cross the Thames on this bridge.

A bridge was first built here in 1837 being a flat timber bridge of beams on posts. Prior to this there was a ferry although occasionally people would ride across, even driving in a one-horse chaise. In 1674 the ferry turned over in the weir pool with the loss of sixty lives. In the 1970s a Citroën Dyane crashed through the railings at the Streatley end of the bridge landing on a concrete weir 16 feet below.  The local Citroën dealer used the photo to illustrate the inherent strength of their upmarket 2CV.

See also 

 Crossings of the River Thames

References

Bridges in Berkshire
Bridges in Oxfordshire
Bridges completed in 1923
Bridges across the River Thames
1923 establishments in England
Road bridges in England